is a Japanese pop singer and songwriter under the Being label.

Biography
She made her major debut in April 2015 with the single "if ~Hitori Omou~" which was used as the theme song for the game Fire Emblem Fates. In the game itself, she provides the singing voice for the character Azura.

Renka shares very little information through her social networks and official website. She hides her identity, using only her stage name. She has not yet made any TV or visual media appearances, instead working as a radio personality at various radio stations and her own radio Renka Voice....

In August 2017 Renka collaborated with Vocaloid Producer Doriko on his compilation album Doriko 10th anniversary tribute with the song Anata no Negai wo Utau mono.

In October 2017 Renka wrote lyrics for Character Song CD from Anime television series Nobunaga no Shinobi.

In June 2018, Renka participated as a guest vocalist in recording of Akihide's album Kikai Jikake no Yuenchi -Electric Wonderland-  track My Little Clock.

On 23 January 2019, Renka released first studio album Hoshi no Habataku Yoru wa.

In March 2021, Renka announced hiatus from her music activities through official website. At the same time, two previously unreleased songs were published as a digital single.

Discography

Singles

Studio album

Collaboration album

In media
if ~Hitori Omou~: theme song for Nintendo 3DS game Fire Emblem Fates.
Don't Cry: ending theme for the Anime television series Hakuōki Otogisōshi.
Adazakura: opening theme for Anime television series Nobunaga no Shinobi.
Shirayuki: opening song for Anime television series Nobunaga no Shinobi 2nd season.
Kingyo Namida: opening theme for Anime television series Nobunaga no Shinobi 3rd season.

References

External links
Official Website

Living people
Being Inc. artists
Japanese women songwriters
Year of birth missing (living people)
Japanese radio personalities
21st-century Japanese women singers